Rebeca Valenzuela Álvarez (born 1 September 1992) is a visually impaired Mexican Paralympic athlete. She represented Mexico at the Summer Paralympics in 2012, 2016 and 2021 and she won the bronze medal in the women's shot put F12 event in 2016. She also won the bronze medal in the same event at the 2020 Summer Paralympics.

In 2019, she qualified to represent Mexico at the 2020 Summer Paralympics in Tokyo, Japan after winning the bronze medal in the women's shot put F12 event at the 2019 World Para Athletics Championships held in Dubai, United Arab Emirates. She also competed in the women's javelin throw F13 event where she finished in 6th place.

References

External links 
 

Living people
1992 births
Sportspeople from Hermosillo
Athletes (track and field) at the 2012 Summer Paralympics
Athletes (track and field) at the 2016 Summer Paralympics
Athletes (track and field) at the 2020 Summer Paralympics
Medalists at the 2016 Summer Paralympics
Medalists at the 2020 Summer Paralympics
Paralympic bronze medalists for Mexico
Paralympic medalists in athletics (track and field)
Paralympic athletes of Mexico
Medalists at the World Para Athletics Championships
Medalists at the 2015 Parapan American Games
Medalists at the 2019 Parapan American Games
Mexican female javelin throwers
Mexican female shot putters
20th-century Mexican women
21st-century Mexican women